Just for Laughs is a comedy festival held each July in Montreal, Quebec, Canada. Founded in 1983, it is the largest international comedy festival in the world. It also serves as a television division.

History

Just for Laughs was formed in 1983 as a two-day French-language event. In 1985, Andy Nulman joined the festival's staff and introduced English-language events as well; under Nulman's stewardship, the festival increased to a full month, with French-speaking performers during the first half, and English speakers in the second half. International and non-verbal acts (acrobats, pantomimes, etc.) are scattered throughout the program.

In 1999, Nulman left the festival's full-time employ; however, he directed its major Gala Shows at the Saint-Denis Theatre every July, and remained on the board of directors of the festival's parent company. After an 11-year absence, Nulman returned to Just for Laughs in July 2010 as president of Festivals and Television.

Each day, performers, "New Vaudevillians" and other acts both vocal and visual perform throughout the city, particularly in the "Latin Quarter"—an area known for its theatres, cafés and boutique shopping. In the evenings, the nightclubs and live venue theatres offer special programs supporting the performers.

Although Just For Laughs attracts spectators from around the world, many of those in the audience are talent scouts, booking agents, producers, and managers from the entertainment industry. Performing at the festival is one of the biggest opportunities for undiscovered talent to showcase their act in front of industry professionals.

The Just For Laughs festival also has the Comedia comedy film festival component, which started in 1996. It gives awards for feature and short films. In 2005, Comedia screened 125 short films from around the world as well as several feature-length films.

In February 1994, the festival sponsored a splinter project in Hollywood, Florida. That coastal area is a favourite winter destination for Quebecers who head south to vacation in the warmer weather. The event, Juste Pour Rire—En Vacances (Just For Laughs—On Vacation), was held in the Young Circle Park, an outdoor venue with an urban park setting.

In July 2007, Just For Laughs celebrated its 25th edition, launching a festival in Toronto, Ontario.

In 2009, a U.S. edition of the festival was held in Chicago, sponsored by U.S. cable network TBS.

On November 24, 2010, it was announced that they have to move the Just for Laughs galas to Place des Arts and that the 2011 festival in the Saint-Denis Theatre would be recycled due to budget cuts. 

In July 2016, Just For Laughs London was held at Russell Square.

On April 1, 2019, Just For Laughs name went fully stylized to Just for laughs. On April 3, 2020, it was announced that the 2020 edition of Just For Laughs would be postponed until the fall due to the coronavirus pandemic. It was scheduled to run from September 29 to October 11, 2020, however, on July 21, 2020, organizers reversed their decision and cancelled the event. To fill the gap, they choose for a series of virtual performances that will run online (via the Internet only), for two days, on October 9 and 10, 2020.

Sale to ICM Partners, Bell and the Molson family 
On October 18, 2017, festival president and founder Gilbert Rozon resigned from his position following allegations of sexual misconduct. Rozon later announced that he would sell the festival. As per a partnership with the conglomerate, Quebecor was given right of first refusal to counter competing offers. The company, however, declined. On March 21, 2018, it was announced that the entire company would be acquired by a partnership between U.S.-based talent agency ICM Partners and Ontario comedian Howie Mandel. In their announcement of the purchase, it was stated that Just for Laughs would remain based in Montreal (with Mandel considering the event to be a key component of local culture), and that there would be no changes in its management or operations. It was also stated that the partnership was seeking other local partners. Quebecor subsequently announced that it would become a "founding partner" of Le Grand Montréal Comédie Fest—a competing event (which lasted 2 years) that has been established by a group of Quebecois comedians as a competitor in the wake of the Rozon scandal.

In May 2018, La Presse reported that the partnership planned to sell a 51% stake in Just for Laughs to Bell Canada and Evenko (an event management company owned by the Montreal Canadiens' ownership group Groupe CH, in turn owned by the Molson family), so that the event would remain majority-owned by Canadian interests and remain eligible for government tax credits. On June 7, 2018, Just For Laughs confirmed that Bell Media and Groupe CH had acquired stakes in the festival.

In July 2022, Just for Laughs announced a line-up of 62 comedians that will be featured in the Montreal festival that will run from July 13 to 31st. This festival also marks the 40th anniversary of Just for Laughs.

TV shows

Tapings from festival performances have been featured in Just for Laughs-branded television programs and specials, which have aired on channels such as CBC Television, Radio-Canada, The Comedy Network (including the original Just for Laughs series, as well as a new series that premiered in 2012, Just for Laughs: All Access), and TVA.

A UK series, also entitled Just for Laughs, aired on Channel 4 from 1987 to 1996.

Just For Laughs Australia screens on the Ten Network in Australia and features highlights from the festival with an emphasis on Australian comedy performers. 

The festival has also lent its name to a hidden camera comedy series, Just for Laughs: Gags, which has also been aired by various Canadian channels, and has been sold internationally.

In 2018, Radio-Canada and The Comedy Network (now called CTV Comedy Channel) briefly dropped all Just for Laughs programming, apparently caused by Gilbert Rozon allegations of sexual misconduct. TVA continued to air Just for Laughs: Gags, but renamed Les Gags. CBC Television still air Just for Laughs: Gags with no changes. Following the festival's subsequent ownership changes, CTV Comedy and other Bell Media channels have resumed airing festival programming.

Mascot
Victor is the mascot and logo for the comedy festival Just for Laughs. It was designed by Vittorio Fiorucci of the Canadian Design Resource company.

The image was inspired by a monster that preys on Montreal. The logo can be seen across the world on posters, T-shirts, event site markers, costumes, and inflatables.

In 2005 the character was redesigned by animator Alan Best at the behest of advertising agency Cossette as part of a comprehensive graphic overhaul of the Just For Laughs brand.  
In 2007, "Rose" was created, a character to be the wife of Victor.

See also
Culture of Quebec
Edinburgh Festival Fringe
Just for Laughs Museum (closed)
List of Quebec comedians
List of Quebec television series
Melbourne International Comedy Festival
Television of Quebec

References

External links
Official website

Just for Laughs 
Juste Pour Rire: Juste Le Meilleur des Galas 2005 
Juste Pour Rire: Juste le Meilleur des Galas 2006 
Juste Pour Rire: Les Grands Moments - Volume 1 
Just for Laughs: Stand Up, Vol. 1 - Best of the Uptown Comics 
 Just for Laughs: Stand Up, Vol. 2 - On the Edge 

 
Comedy festivals in Canada
Festivals in Montreal
Television shows filmed in Montreal
1980s Canadian sketch comedy television series
1990s Canadian sketch comedy television series
2000s Canadian sketch comedy television series
2010s Canadian sketch comedy television series
CBC Television original programming
Year of Canadian television series debut missing
Year of Canadian television series ending missing
CTV Comedy Channel original programming
Recurring events established in 1983
Quartier des spectacles
Canadian stand-up comedy television series
Performing arts in Montreal